Jules Van Craen (3 September 1920 – 15 October 1945) was a Belgian footballer. He played in two matches for the Belgium national football team in 1940, scoring four goals.

References

External links
 

1920 births
1945 deaths
Belgian footballers
Belgium international footballers
Association football forwards
Footballers from Antwerp Province